Alseodaphne is a genus of plants in the family Lauraceae,
endemic to China and Southeast Asia.
The genus has 96 species of evergreen trees to shrubs. They have bisexual flowers, a fruit stalk that is red, green, or yellow, and black fruit.

Species include:
 Alseodaphne albifrons
 Alseodaphne andersonii
 Alseodaphne bancana
 Alseodaphne birmanica
 Alseodaphne borneensis
 Alseodaphne cavaleriei
 Alseodaphne dura
 Alseodaphne elmeri
 Alseodaphne elongata
 Alseodaphne foxiana
 Alseodaphne garciniicarpa
 Alseodaphne glauciflora
 Alseodaphne glaucina
 Alseodaphne gracilis
 Alseodaphne griffithii
 Alseodaphne habrotricha
 Alseodaphne hainanensis
 Alseodaphne himalayana
 Alseodaphne hokouensis
 Alseodaphne huanglianshanensis
 Alseodaphne insignis
 Alseodaphne intermedia
 Alseodaphne keenanii
 Alseodaphne khasyana
 Alseodaphne kochummenii
 Alseodaphne lanuginosa
 Alseodaphne longipes
 Alseodaphne macrantha
 Alseodaphne marlipoensis
 Alseodaphne medogensis
 Alseodaphne micrantha
 Alseodaphne montana
 Alseodaphne nigrescens
 Alseodaphne oblanceolata
 Alseodaphne owdenii
 Alseodaphne paludosa
 Alseodaphne peduncularis
 Alseodaphne pendulifolia
 Alseodaphne perakensis
 Alseodaphne petiolaris
 Alseodaphne philippinensis
 Alseodaphne ramosii
 Alseodaphne rhododendropsis
 Alseodaphne ridleyi
 Alseodaphne rubriflora
 Alseodaphne rubrolignea
 Alseodaphne rugosa
 Alseodaphne semecarpifolia
 Alseodaphne siamensis
 Alseodaphne sichourensis
 Alseodaphne suboppositifolia
 Alseodaphne sulcata
 Alseodaphne tomentosa
 Alseodaphne tonkinensis 
 Alseodaphne utilis
 Alseodaphne wrayi
 Alseodaphne yunnanensis

Chemistry
Perakensol is a phenanthrenoid that can be isolated from A. perakensis.

References

 
Lauraceae genera
Taxonomy articles created by Polbot